The 2012–13 FSV Frankfurt season is the 114th season in the club's football history. In 2012–13 the club plays in the 2. Bundesliga, the second tier of German football. It is the clubs fifth consecutive season in this league, having played at this level since 2007–08, having been promoted from the Regionalliga in 2007.

The club also takes part in the 2012–13 edition of the DFB-Pokal, the German Cup, where it reached the second round and will face Bundesliga side VfL Wolfsburg. They lost 2–0 in the second round against, thus ending their participation in the competition.

Matches

Legend

Friendly matches

2. Bundesliga

DFB-Pokal

Sources

External links
 2012–13 FSV Frankfurt season at Weltfussball.de 
 2012–13 FSV Frankfurt season at kicker.de 
 2012–13 FSV Frankfurt season at Fussballdaten.de 

Frankfurt
FSV Frankfurt seasons